"Bar Bar Bar" is the second single album, and fourth single overall by Crayon Pop. It was released digitally on June 20, 2013 by Chrome Entertainment and distributed by CJ E&M Music. "Bar Bar Bar" became a viral hit in late July, eventually reaching number one on Billboard's K-Pop Hot 100 chart and number three on the Gaon Digital Chart.

Release and promotion

On June 8, Crayon Pop performed "Bar Bar Bar" for the first time at the Migliore Festival. The single album was released digitally on June 20 and a choreography music video was released three days later. Following this release, Crayon Pop's unique outfits and choreography drew interest and their popularity rose. The group wore helmets and colorful tracksuits, and the dance featured choreographed jumping, dubbed the "Straight-Five Engine Dance" by fans because it resembled the movement of engine cylinders. The song and dance were often called addictive, with easy-to-follow choreography and simple, repetitive lyrics. Member Way said, "Overall, the lyrics mean let's jump together. It's meant to give a source of energy and strength to the tired people. It just means let's all dance together and have fun."

Their first music show performance was on MBC's Music Core on June 22. The song was promoted on music shows through July and August, with the last performance being on KBS Music Bank on September 6. Crayon Pop was often in contention for first place during the month of August. They lost numerous times to Exo's "Growl" before "Bar Bar Bar" won first place on Music Bank on August 30.

Music videos
The "Bar Bar Bar" story version music video was released on June 13, a week before the song's digital release. On June 23, the choreography version was released. This music video was filmed in Yongma Land, an abandoned amusement park in Jungnang-gu, with a budget of only 380,000 won (US$338). As of July 2021, the choreography music video has more than 66 million views on YouTube.

On September 9, a "Global Version" music video was released. It was aimed at an international audience and was filmed in popular locations in Seoul including Noksapyeong Station, Garosu Street, Ttukseom Hangang Park and Children's Grand Park. "Bar Bar Bar" has been compared to Psy's "Gangnam Style" and this music video contains several references to Psy's song. The audio was slightly remixed; this remix was later released as "Bar Bar Bar 2.0" on the mini album, The Streets Go Disco.

Reception and accolades
"Bar Bar Bar" entered the Gaon Digital Chart at number 143 in the first week of its release. As "Bar Bar Bar" went viral, it gradually rose in the charts. In its seventh week, the song peaked at number three on the Gaon Digital Chart, and spent a total of 31 consecutive weeks on the chart. It reached number one on Billboard's K-Pop Hot 100 eight weeks after release, and was number nine on the year-end chart. Music industry officials commented that the song's chart trajectory was rare, because normally a song reaches peak position soon after release before being pushed down as time passes.

YG Entertainment's CEO Yang Hyun-suk praised Crayon Pop for having the best hit song of the first half of 2013. He said, "Other than 'Gentleman', the biggest hit was 'Bar Bar Bar'. Even my kid knows about Crayon Pop. People aren't interested about which song is at number one these days. What's important is whether people know about a singer and if they have fans. Crayon Pop succeeded in that sense". Jeff Benjamin of Billboard credited the song's success to its "quirky video, fun dance and catchy hook".

Taylor Glasby of Dazed ranked the song ninth on the publication's "Top ten K-Pop of 2013". He described the group as "simultaneously creepy and adorable" and the song as "cheekily adventurous" with an "earworm chorus" and "iconic" dance. He also said the song is "smarter than it first appears", with layered 1980s brass and 1970s disco beats. Scott Interrante, writing for PopMatters, discussed "Bar Bar Bar" in his overview of K-pop in 2013: "The song and video are bratty, obnoxious, and totally awesome. Its hallyu style is so extreme it can convincingly be taken as satire. But one thing that’s certain is that it's going to get stuck in your head and annoy you probably forever."

"Bar Bar Bar" won Crayon Pop a New Rising Star award at the 28th Golden Disk Awards. It also received nominations for the Music Video Award at the MelOn Music Awards, Song of the Year and Best Dance & Electronic Song at the Korean Music Awards, and Song of the Year and Best Dance Performance - Female Group at the Mnet Asian Music Awards.

In popular culture

Many groups covered the dance or made parody videos, including M.I.B., MBLAQ, Perfume, Justice Crew and the Gyungbuk women's police department. On August 13, 2013, "Bar Bar Bar" was parodied on SNL Korea by guest Kim Gura and the SNL cast. On October 19, the song was again featured on SNL Korea, this time danced by actor Tom Hiddleston.

On February 20, 2014, a dance cover by Taiwanese twin six-year-olds, Zony and Yony, was uploaded to YouTube. This video also went viral and has more than 5 million views as of October 2014. As a result of this video, the twins were invited on The Ellen DeGeneres Show, where they performed the "Bar Bar Bar" dance.

On August 17, 2014, "Bar Bar Bar" was included in the soundtrack of the tvN historical drama, The Three Musketeers. The song was arranged in the style of traditional Korean music. On October 21, "Bar Bar Bar" was featured in the fourth episode of American TV series Selfie, with actors Karen Gillan and John Cho dancing to the song.

Track listing
All music composed by Kim Yoo-min and Lee Da-kyeong. All tracks arranged by Kim and Lee Seung-yeop

Charts

Weekly charts

Monthly charts

Year-end charts

Sales and certifications

Release history

References

External links
 "Bar Bar Bar" (Story Version) Music Video
 "Bar Bar Bar" (Choreography Version) Music Video
 "Bar Bar Bar" (Global Version) Music Video

2013 singles
2013 songs
Korean-language songs
Crayon Pop songs
Billboard Korea K-Pop number-one singles